Baaghi ( Rebel) is a 2016 Indian Hindi-language action thriller film directed by Sabbir Khan and produced by Sajid Nadiadwala under his banner Nadiadwala Grandson Entertainment. A remake of the 2004 Telugu film Varsham, with a climax inspired by the 2011 Indonesian film The Raid: Redemption, the film stars Tiger Shroff and Shraddha Kapoor in the lead roles and Sudheer Babu in his Hindi debut, with Sunil Grover in a supporting role.

Baaghi was released worldwide on 29 April 2016. Later on, it spawned two spiritual sequels, Baaghi 2 (2018) and Baaghi 3 (2020), thus becoming the first installment in the Baaghi film series. The film received mixed reviews from critics with praise towards the production values, action sequences and cast performances.

Plot 
 
Raghav Shetty is a Kalaripayattu champion, Martial Art World Champion and a dreaded gangster, who abducts Sia Khurana from her film's set in Hyderabad and takes her to Bangkok. Sia's father, P.P. Khurana, along with the producer Dasanna seeks the government officers and cops for help, but no one is ready to assist them as Raghav is an influential man and there is unavailability of extradition treaty between India and Thailand in existence. Khurana then suggests to Dasanna that Sia's ex-boyfriend, Ranveer "Ronny" Singh is the only person left for the job as he can rescue Sia from the gritty underbelly of Thailand where Raghav rules. Ronny is the only strong and the rebellious martial artist who can destroy Raghav and can rescue Sia. Initially hesitant, Ronny agrees to do so, since he needs money to treat Subbu, a mute young boy who is being treated for his vocal cords.

An ensuing flashback of events reflects Ronny and Sia's relationship. Ronny meets Siya on a train where he falls in love with Sia at first sight and also sees that Sia also carries a rebellious personality. They both later hit it off dancing at a station where Raghav sees her and is besotted with her. At the behest of his late father Colonel Samarjit Singh, Ronny unwillingly becomes the student in the Kerala Academy Of Kalaripayattu, headed by Samarjit's former army colleague and Raghav's father Kailash Shetty a.k.a. Guruswamy; in due course of time, Guruswamy disciplines Ronny into a rebel with a cause; thus making Ronny a Strong and a Rebellious Martial Artist as well as making him successful master the martial art of Kalaripayattu. As time goes on, Ronny and Sia fall in love with each other.  Ronny and Khurana befriend each other as well. A money-minded Khurana agrees to marry Sia off to Raghav, who lures him with bundles of money. On learning that Sia is in love with Ronny, Khurana acts derisively towards Ronny and rats him out to Raghav, who swears to kill Ronny; Guruswamy overhears the plan, though, and objects to it strongly. Feeling humiliated and enraged, Raghav kills Guruswamy by poisoning him to death. Raghav then tells his henchmen to get Ronny in front of him. The henchmen tries to harm Ronnie and the mute child Subbu but Ronny beats up Raghav’s henchmen brutally. Following a confrontation with Raghav and then later’s Guruswamy's funeral, Khurana creates an atmosphere of misunderstanding in league with Raghav, which works, causing Ronny and Sia to part ways.

Back in the present, Ronny reaches Bangkok and visits Raghav's fight club, beating the most potent fighter there to get Raghav's attention. Raghav sends his henchmen to kill Ronnie but Ronnie successfully kills them and beats them up brutally. The next day, Ronny breaks into the house of Raghav's right-hand man, Biju, and holds Biju's wife at gunpoint, forcing him to reveal Sia's location. Learning that she is at the local hospital, Ronny saves Sia and escapes with her under both of them being disguised. Raghav does manage to spot them but couldn’t do anything. The two stop at an island on their way back to India, where Sia discovers her father's deceit and the couple reunite.

Raghav and his men suddenly attack the couple off-guard; Biju shoots Ronny, who falls off a cliff. Raghav takes Sia back to his place, but Sia realizes that Ronny is alive, with Raghav being alerted to his invasive underbelly moments later. Realizing Biju's treachery, he questions him; Biju affirms that he spared Ronny as he had spared his wife earlier. Unconvinced, Raghav slits Biju's throat. Ronny storms Raghav's building and single-handedly fights off all of the killers and swordsmen in Raghav's employ. He reaches Raghav, who initially overpowers him, but when Raghav reveals that he was the one who murdered Guruswamy, Ronny becomes enraged and uses Guruswamy's signature moves to kill Raghav. Now happily together with Sia, Ronny becomes the new teacher in Guruswamy's school, where a statue of Guruswamy now stands.

Cast 
Tiger Shroff as Ranveer "Ronny" Singh, Sia's love interest
Shraddha Kapoor as Sia Khurana, Ronny's love interest and Paresh's daughter
Sudheer Babu as Raghav Shetty, a gangster and Kalaripayattu champion; voice-over by Viraj Adhav
Sourav Chakraborty as Biju, Raghav's henchman
Shifuji Shaurya Bhardwaj as Kailash Shetty a.k.a. Guruswamy, Raghav's father and master of Kalaripayattu
Sunil Grover as Paresh Prakash Khurana "P. P.", Sia's father
Kota Srinivasa Rao as film producer Dasanna
Buddya Sunari Magar as Referee
Sanjay Mishra as Harry, a blind taxi driver in Bangkok
Sumit Gulati as Sukhi
Biswapati Sarkar as Hari, Ronny's friend 
Prashant Singh as Gopi
Aryan Prajapati as Subbu, a mute little boy who is close to Ronny
Arun Bali in a voiceover appearance as Col. Samarjit Singh, Guruswamy's friend and Ronny's father

Production 
Shroff trained and took up stunt classes for the film. Sajid Nadiadwala hired a special team of 50 people to keep Shroff's look under wraps. The makers did not want his look to be revealed because of his role in the film being distinct from his role in Heropanti. Telugu actor Sudheer Babu was signed to play a negative role, making his Bollywood debut. Shooting for Baaghi started on 27 May 2015. The shooting of the film completed on 21 February 2016. The film was extensively shot in India and Thailand. Soma Kerala Palace, Kochi was shown in the movie as the KARMA Institute (school of Guruswamy). Song Sab Tera was shot in the exotic Poda Island.

Soundtrack 

The music of the film was composed by Meet Bros, Amaal Mallik, Ankit Tiwari, Manj Musik and Pranaay Rijia, while the score was composed by Julius Packiam. The song lyrics were written by Kumaar, Abhendra Kumar Upadhyay, Sanjeev Chaturvedi, Raftaar, Sabbir Khan and Rahul B. Seth. The first song of the film, "Sab Tera" was released on 18 March 2016, which was sung by Shraddha Kapoor and Armaan Malik. The second song of the film titled as "Let's Talk About Love", which was sung by Raftaar and Neha Kakkar
was released on 25 March 2016.
The album was released on 29 March 2016, which includes 6 songs.

Box office
Released on a Friday, the film netted 119.4 million, 11.13 crore, and 155.1 million respectively on its first three days, bringing in a total of 38.58 crore net on its opening weekend and meeting its 37 crore production cost. By its seventh day, the film had netted 59.72 crore. Baaghis daily collection peaked at 15.51 crore net on day three and began to decline thereafter, losing 79% of business by the end of the second week. The movie ultimately grossed 106.03 crore from India and 21.02 crore overseas, for a total worldwide gross estimate of 127.05 crores, one of the highest-grossing films of Shroff's career.

Critical reception 
The film received mixed reviews from critics. The Times of India gave the film 2.5 out of 5 writing "Baaghi blooms only during the fights but by the time the clock ticks towards the climax, you are exhausted. How much can you hoot for broken necks and crushed bones? You could try finding thrill in Tiger’s kicks but the film has nothing more to offer." India Glitz also gave the film 2.5 out of 5 and wrote "Baaghi' has rebellious action with bland reasons attached to it due to which it will cater only to those who love good action films and the single screen audience. The multiplex and family audience might not like the gore action with mindless drama attached to it."Film Companion gave the film 2 out of 5 while writing "Baaghi will best serve people who are interested in moves rather than movies." Hindustan Times gave the film 2 out of 5 and wrote "In short, The Karate Kid enters Bloodsport and appears in a hurry to become Ong-Bak without losing the essential Bollywood qualities. Baaghi shines only in patches."

The Indian Express gave the film 2 out of 5 writing "Shraddha Kapoor is slender and pretty and executes both the ‘chham chham’ in the rain as well as some roundhouse kicks and punches well enough, but is fashioned like a Bollywood heroine belonging to the potboilers of the 70s and 80s. She isn’t dragged by the hair like the leading lady of ‘Heropanti’, Tiger’s debut (also directed by Sabbir Khan) but does everything else – simper, smile, and squeal in the villain’s den."

Sequel 

On 1 May 2017, Shroff posted the first look poster of the sequel and the second installment of the Baaghi seriesBaaghi 2 on his Twitter account. Nadiadwala collaborated with Fox Star Studios following the dissolution of UTV Motion Pictures and the film was released under Fox Star Studios and Nadiadwala Grandson Entertainment. Directed by Ahmed Khan, the film was released worldwide on 30 March 2018. A third installment was also announced under the title of Baaghi 3, with Nadiadwala the producer, Khan the director, and Shroff in the lead role.

References

External links
 
 

2016 films
2010s Hindi-language films
Indian action thriller films
Films scored by Meet Bros Anjjan
Films scored by Ankit Tiwari
Films scored by Manj Musik
Films scored by Amaal Mallik
Indian martial arts films
2016 action thriller films
Hindi remakes of Telugu films
Films shot in Thailand
Kalarippayattu films
2016 martial arts films
Indian romantic action films
Films directed by Sabbir Khan